Appolinaire, Apollinaire, Apolinare or Apolinaire may refer to:

 Apollinaire Bouchardat (1809–1886), French pharmacist and hygienist
 Apollinaire Joachim Kyélem de Tambèla (born 1955), Prime Minister of Burkina Faso
 Appolinaire Djikeng, Cameroonian biologist
 Appolinaire Djingabeye (born 1993), Chadian professional football player
 Apollinaire de Kontski (1825–1879), Polish violinist, teacher and minor composer
 Apollinare Osadca (1916–1997), Ukrainian-American architect
 Apolinaire Stephen (born 1995), Vanuatan cricketer
 Guillaume Apollinaire (1880–1918), French poet

See also
 Saint-Apollinaire (disambiguation)
 Sant'Apollinare (disambiguation)

Masculine given names